City of Elmina is a township in Sungai Buloh, Selangor, Malaysia. Formerly known as Elmina Estate owned by Guthrie Berhad (now Sime Darby), it is later turned into a township which is developed by Sime Darby Properties.

Access

Car
Guthrie Corridor Expressway  runs along the western boundary of the township.

Public transportation
Closest rail station is  MRT Kwasa Damansara, about 6.7 km east.

Public amenities

School
SJK (C) Ladang Regent

References

Petaling District
Townships in Selangor